The Wills Creek Bollman Bridge originally served the Baltimore and Ohio Railroad's Pittsburgh Division main line.

Designed by the self-taught civil engineer Wendel Bollman in 1871, this truss bridge is the last remaining span of the Pittsburgh Division line associated with Bollman.

Though it was designed by Wendell Bollman, it does not employ his famous Bollman truss, but rather a Warren truss. The east abutments are constructed of concrete, while the west are earthen with wood ties. This bridge has a wood deck, and ornate cast iron end pieces, lacework, and compression members. End posts and tension members are constructed of wrought iron.

The bridge was listed on the National Register of Historic Places on November 8, 1978.

See also
List of bridges documented by the Historic American Engineering Record in Pennsylvania

References

External links

Bridges completed in 1871
Railroad bridges on the National Register of Historic Places in Pennsylvania
Road bridges on the National Register of Historic Places in Pennsylvania
Warren truss bridges in the United States
Baltimore and Ohio Railroad bridges
Former railway bridges in the United States
Bridges in Somerset County, Pennsylvania
Historic American Engineering Record in Pennsylvania
Relocated buildings and structures in Pennsylvania
National Register of Historic Places in Somerset County, Pennsylvania
Wrought iron bridges in the United States